Ptychopariina is an extinct suborder of trilobites of the order Ptychopariida. Also known as the primitive Ptychopariida, they are a notably wide and varied taxon. Some of the representative genera include Elrathia, Densonella, Norwoodia, Tricrepicephalus, Conocoryphe, and Modocia.

Description
Specialization is common in the Ptychopariina, which has made it difficult for authors to develop a single type that can distinguish Ptychopariina from other clades. The thorax tends to be relatively long, with the pygidium generally smaller in size than the thorax.

References

External links
Ptychopariida fact sheet (trilobites.info)
Ptychopariina
Ptychopariina

Cambrian trilobites
Ptychopariida
Arthropod suborders